Trust of Thieves (German:Trust der Diebe) is a 1929 German silent film directed by Erich Schönfelder and starring Agnes Esterhazy, Paul Otto and Eva von Berne.

The film's art direction was by Karl Görge.

Cast
Agnes Esterhazy as Lady Rellonay
Paul Otto as Juwelier Voilson
Eva von Berne as Miss Smith, Kriminalassistentin
Oscar Marion as Charlie
Kurt Vespermann as burglar
Paul Graetz as burglar
Krafft-Raschig as burglar
Carl Goetz as Greimann, the banker
Otto Wallburg as detective commissioner Warren
Philipp Manning as coroner
Louis Treumann as Member of the Supervisory Board
Ernst Pittschau as Member of the Supervisory Board
Arthur Duarte as Member of the Supervisory Board

References

External links

Films of the Weimar Republic
Films directed by Erich Schönfelder
German silent feature films
Films based on Austrian novels
German black-and-white films